Africa One Antonov An-26 crash may refer to:

 2002 Africa One Antonov An-26 crash
 2007 Africa One Antonov An-26 crash